Professor Shulamit Elizur, born April 6, 1955, is a scholar of ancient and medieval piyyut (Hebrew poetry). She is the head of the Fleischer Institute for the Study of Hebrew Poetry, a member of the Academy of the Hebrew Language, and a member of the editorial board of the Mekize Nirdamim publishing house.

Early life and education
She was born in Jerusalem, to Leah and Meir Hovav. She received her bachelor's degree at the Hebrew University of Jerusalem, in the departments of Hebrew language and Hebrew literature. She then entered directly into a doctoral program under the tutelage of Ezra Fleischer, in which she wrote her dissertation on the piyyutim of a paytan named Eleazar b. Qilar; she proved that this poet was a completely different individual from the famous poet Eleazar b. Qallir ("the Qalliri"). She later published this dissertation, including the full surviving corpus of Eleazar b. Qilar, as a book in 1988.

Career
Elizur has been teaching at the Hebrew University for many years, and has published nearly one hundred articles in the field of ancient and medieval piyyut, for a scholarly audience. In 1999, she wrote a book for a more general Hebrew-reading audience, שירהּ של פרשה (Shirah shel Parasha, A Poem for Every Parasha), for which she won the prestigious Rabbi Kook Prize, and thus is the first and only woman ever to receive this prize, since it was started in 1943. She has also won the Ben-Zvi Prize.

Publications
In addition to publishing the corpus of R. Eleazar b. Qilar, she has published the work of many other forgotten paytanim of the first- and second-millennium Middle East:
Binyamin bar Yehuda (Mekize Nirdamim, 1988);
Yosef Ha-levi ben Khalfun (Magnes Press, 1994);
Yehoshua bar Khalfa (Yad Ben-Zvi, 1994);
Pinhas Ha-kohen (World Union of Jewish Studies, 2004);
and most recently, Yedutun Ha-levi He-haver (in the jubilee volume for Mordecai Akiva Friedman, 2010).

She has also published two volumes (for Rosh Hashanah and Yom Kippur respectively, with other volumes in preparation) of small portions of the immense corpus of Eleazar b. Qallir, as well as a book on the development of the קדושתא genre of piyyut.

She has also published Sod Meshalshei Kodosh which traces the historical development of the Qedushta genre of Piyyut.

References

External links 
 Ancient Jewish Poetry and the Amazing World of Piyut, an interview with Elizur by Batheva Sasson
 Her biography on the website of the Academy for the Hebrew Language
 List of her publications (incomplete)

Living people
Year of birth missing (living people)